Appetite for Destruction is the debut studio album by American hard rock band Guns N' Roses, released by Geffen Records on July 21, 1987. It initially received little mainstream attention, and it was not until the following year that Appetite for Destruction became a commercial success, after the band had toured and received significant airplay with the singles "Welcome to the Jungle", "Paradise City", and "Sweet Child o' Mine". The album went on to peak at number one on the US Billboard 200, and it became the seventh best-selling album of all time in the United States, as well as the best-selling debut album. With over 30 million copies sold worldwide, it is also one of the best-selling albums globally. 

Although critics were originally ambivalent toward the album, Appetite for Destruction has received retrospective acclaim and been viewed as one of the greatest albums of all time . In 2018, it was re-released as a remastered box set to similar acclaim.

Background
Guns N' Roses' first recordings were for a planned EP in March 1985, shortly after the band formed, with "Don't Cry", a cover of "Heartbreak Hotel", "Think About You" and "Anything Goes". However, plans for the release fell through, as original guitarist Tracii Guns left the band, being replaced by Slash. Shortly afterward, the classic lineup of Axl Rose, Duff McKagan, Slash, Steven Adler, and Izzy Stradlin was finalized.

After heavy touring of the Los Angeles club scene, the group signed with Geffen Records in March 1986. In December of that year, the group released the four-song EP Live ?!*@ Like a Suicide, which was designed to keep interest in the band alive while the group withdrew from the club scene to work in the studio. The EP release was also designed to soothe the label, which believed the band did not have enough songs to record a full-length album.

Writing and recording
Rose stated many of the songs on the album were written while the band was performing on the Los Angeles club circuit, and a number of songs that were ultimately featured on later Guns N' Roses albums were considered for Appetite for Destruction, such as "Back Off Bitch", "You Could Be Mine", "November Rain" and "Don't Cry". It is said that the reason for not putting "November Rain" on Appetite for Destruction was that the band had already agreed to put "Sweet Child o' Mine" on the album, and thus already had a "ballad" on the track list.

Producer Spencer Proffer was hired to record "Nightrain" and "Sweet Child o' Mine" to test his chemistry with the band. The band eventually recorded nine songs with Proffer during these sessions, including "Heartbreak Hotel", "Don't Cry", "Welcome to the Jungle", and "Shadow of Your Love". In mid- to late 1986, the band recorded demos with Nazareth guitarist Manny Charlton, which were released in 2018 (see below for more info). The band initially considered Paul Stanley of KISS to produce, but he was rejected after he wanted to change Adler's drum set more than Adler wanted. Robert John "Mutt" Lange was also considered, but the label didn't want to spend the extra money on a famous producer. Ultimately, Mike Clink (who had produced several Triumph records) was chosen, and the group recorded "Shadow of Your Love" first with Clink as a test.

After some weeks of rehearsal, the band entered Daryl Dragon's Rumbo Recorders in January 1987. Two weeks were spent recording basic tracks, with Clink splicing together the best takes with his razor blade. Clink worked eighteen-hour days for the next month, with Slash overdubbing in the afternoon and evening, and Rose performing vocals. Slash struggled to find a guitar sound, before coming up with a Gibson Les Paul copy equipped with Seymour Duncan Alnico II pickups and plugged into a Marshall amplifier. He spent hours with Clink paring down and structuring his solos. The total budget for the album was about $370,000. According to drummer Steven Adler, the percussion was done in just six days, but Rose's vocals took much longer, as he insisted on doing them one line at a time, and Rose's perfectionism drove the rest of the band away from the studio as he worked. Final overdubs and mixing were done at Mediasound Studios, and mastering at Sterling Sound in New York City.

Many of the songs on Appetite For Destruction began as solo tracks that individual band members began separately from the band, only to be completed later. These songs include "It's So Easy" (Duff McKagan) and "Think About You" (Izzy Stradlin). "Rocket Queen" was an unfinished Slash/McKagan/Adler song from their earlier band Road Crew, and "Anything Goes", written by Hollywood Rose and included on their compilation album The Roots of Guns N' Roses, was re-written for Appetite. Most of the songs reflect the band's personal experiences and daily life, such as "Welcome to the Jungle", some of the lyrics of which Rose wrote after he encountered a man in New York shortly after arriving there from Indiana in 1980, and "Mr. Brownstone", which is about the band's problems with heroin. Lyrics to some of the songs focus on the band members' younger years, like "Out ta Get Me", which focuses on lead singer Axl Rose's constant trouble with the law as a youth in Indiana.

In 1999, Rose decided to re-record the album with the then current lineup of Guns N' Roses (Rose, Robin Finck, Tommy Stinson, Paul Tobias, Josh Freese, Dizzy Reed, and Chris Pitman) to "spruce up" the album with new recording techniques. This re-recorded version of the album was never released, although the second half of the re-recorded version of "Sweet Child o' Mine" can be heard (following the first half of a live performance of the song) during the end credits of the 1999 film Big Daddy.

Artwork
The album's original cover art was based on Robert Williams' painting Appetite for Destruction. It depicted a robotic rapist about to be punished by a metal avenger. After several music retailers refused to stock the album, the label compromised and put the controversial cover art inside, replacing it with an image depicting a Celtic cross and skulls representing each of the five band members (top skull: Izzy Stradlin, left skull: Steven Adler, center skull: Axl Rose, right skull: Duff McKagan, and bottom skull: Slash). In a 2016 interview, Billy White Jr., who designed the tattoo with the cross and skulls upon which the album artwork was based, explained: "The cross and skulls that looked like the band was Axl's idea, the rest was me. The knot work in the cross was a reference to Thin Lizzy, a band Axl and I both loved." The original cover was supposed to be on the 2008 vinyl reissue of the album, though the record label replaced it with the "skulls" art at the last minute. The photographs used for the back of the album and liner notes were taken by Robert John, Marc Canter, Jack Lue, Leonard McCardie, and Greg Freeman.

The band stated the original artwork was "a symbolic social statement, with the robot representing the industrial system that's raping and polluting our environment." In albums which were issued on double sided media (vinyl records and audio cassettes), the two sides were labeled "G" and "R", rather than the conventional "A" and "B". Tracks 1–6, which compose side "G", all deal with drugs and hard life in the big city ("Guns" side). The remaining tracks, which compose side "R", all deal with love, sex, and relationships ("Roses" side). In an interview with That Metal Show in 2011, Rose stated his initial idea was for the cover art to be the photo of the Space Shuttle Challenger exploding that was on the cover of Time magazine in 1986, but Geffen rejected the idea, saying it was "in bad taste".

Marketing and sales

When Appetite for Destruction was released by Geffen Records on July 21, 1987, it received little notice from American press and radio, apart from some airplay in California. Music journalist Stephen Davis later attributed this to competing rock music in the mainstream at the time, including Aerosmith's comeback hit album Permanent Vacation, Def Leppard's presence on radio with their Hysteria album, and the dominance of U2's spiritual rock over MTV's prime-time viewership. The album debuted at number 182 on the Billboard 200 the week of August 29, but it only sold 200,000 copies in the first several months of its release, and Geffen planned on "walking away" from the record.

Radio stations originally did not want to play "Welcome to the Jungle", and MTV did not want to air the song's music video. However, after several months of lobbying the network, Geffen general manager Al Coury convinced MTV to play the video just once a night for three nights. "Welcome to the Jungle" became the most requested video on the network, and Coury pitched this success to radio stations, whom he sent promo copies of "Welcome to the Jungle", "Paradise City", and "Sweet Child o' Mine".

With the radio and video airplay, as well as the band's touring, Appetite for Destruction managed to top the Billboard 200 on August 6, 1988, over a year after it was released. It spent four non-consecutive weeks at number one and a total of 147 weeks on the chart. Slash recalled: "We thought we'd made a record that might do as well as, say, Motörhead. It was totally uncommercial. It took a year for it to even get on the charts. No one wanted to know about it."

From 1994 up to 2018 Appetite for Destruction has sales of 1,216,017 in United Kingdom.

By September 2008, the album had been certified 18x platinum by the Recording Industry Association of America (RIAA), having shipped over 18 million copies in the United States, making it the country's 11th best-selling album ever. According to Billboard in 2008, it is also the best-selling debut album of all time in the US. That year, Sky News reported the album's worldwide sales to be approximately 28 million copies, making it one of the best-selling albums of all time; more recent figures have worldwide sales at approximately 30 million units.

Reception and legacy

The album was not well received by contemporary American critics, many of whom complained that its massive success with consumers was fostered by the taboo of "sex, drugs and rock & roll" during the 1980s, when much of the cultural atmosphere in the US became informed by the Reagan-Bush Administration, the AIDS crisis, and the popularity of MTV. Writing in 1987, Dave Ling of Metal Hammer dismissed the album as an inferior mix of elements from bands such as Aerosmith, Hanoi Rocks, and AC/DC. Critics in England were more positive, and Kerrang! claimed that "rock is at last being wrestled from the hands of the bland, the weak, the jaded, the tired, the worn, and being thrust back into the hands of the real raunch rebels." However, the album was voted the 26th best album of the year in The Village Voices 1988 Pazz & Jop, an annual poll of American critics nationwide. Robert Christgau, the poll's supervisor, was qualified in his praise when reviewing the album for his 1990 book Christgau's Record Guide: The '80s. While applauding Rose's "effortless, convincing vocal abilities" as "undeniable and [setting] him apart from his contemporaries", the journalist found his performance undermined by questionable lyrics that reveal darker ideas: "He doesn't love 'Night Train', he loves alcoholism. And once that sweet child o' his proves her devotion by sucking his cock for the portacam, the evil slut is ready for 'See me hit you you fall down.'"

In a retrospective review for The Rolling Stone Album Guide (2004), Ann Powers wrote that Guns N' Roses "produced a unique mix of different rock values", such as "speed and musicianship, flash and dirt", on an album that "changed hard rock's sensibilities at the time." Stephen Thomas Erlewine also viewed the album as a "turning point for hard rock" in his review for AllMusic, and felt Rose's singing and songwriting were enhanced by Slash and Stradlin's dual guitar playing, which helped make Appetite for Destruction "the best metal record of the late '80s". According to Jimmy Martin of The Quietus, the album, which he called "the greatest hard rock record of the 80s", has an "unrefined, punk quality" that marked a "shift away" from the hair metal bands commercialized by MTV. Christa Titus of Billboard said Appetite for Destruction was able to appeal to various rock music listeners because, on it, Guns N' Roses incorporated "metal's forceful playing, punk rock's rebellious themes, glam metal's aesthetic, and bluesy guitar riffs that appealed to purists." Russell Hall, the features writer for Gibson's online publication, said the album "injected a much-needed dose of ’70s-style rebellion into the frothy pop metal of the '80s", by "combining the swagger of late '60s Stones and vintage Aerosmith with the menace of punk and a trash-glam aesthetic".

Writing for Pitchfork, Maura Johnston called the album "a watershed moment in '80s rock that chronicled every vice of Los Angeles led by the lye-voiced Axl Rose and a legendary, switchblade-sharp band." BBC Music's Dennis O'Dell said the engagingly hedonistic album remains the band's best, as did Ric Albano of Classic Rock magazine: "This band would never again reach this level of importance and breakthrough originality." In a 2000 list, Q named it one of the greatest metal albums ever and hailed it as "a riotous celebration of sex, drugs and rock'n'roll". Chuck Klosterman said the album would be the only pop metal album to make a theoretical list of rock's ten best albums, and Chuck Eddy, who called it "the greatest album ever made about how you can't run away from yourself", named it one of his essential hair metal records in Spin. On the other hand, Sputnikmusic said the album has been somewhat overrated, and most of the songs suffer by comparison to the highlights "Welcome to the Jungle", "Sweet Child o' Mine", "Paradise City", "Mr. Brownstone", and "Rocket Queen".

Accolades
According to Acclaimed Music, Appetite for Destruction is the 63rd most ranked record on critics' all-time lists.
 In 1989, Rolling Stone ranked the album as the 27th best album of the 1980s. In 2012, it was ranked #62 on Rolling Stones updated list of "The 500 Greatest Albums of All Time"; it maintained that rank on the 2020 update of the list.
 In 2001, Q magazine listed the album as one of "The 50 Heaviest Albums of All Time". In 2004, Q named it one of "The Greatest Classic Rock Albums Ever". In 2006, Q placed the album at #10 on its list of "The 40 Best Albums of the '80s".
 In 2002, Pitchfork ranked the album at #59 on their list of "The Top 100 Albums of the 1980s". It dropped to #86 on Pitchforks 2018 list of "The 200 Best Albums of the 1980s".
 In 2003, VH1 named the album the 42nd "Greatest Album of All Time".
 In 2004, Kerrang! ranked the album as the #1 most "essential" hard rock album.
 In 2005, Spin ranked the album #18 on their list of "The 100 Greatest Albums, 1985–2005".
 In 2006, the album was included in the book 1001 Albums You Must Hear Before You Die.
 In 2006, the album was placed #2 on Guitar World magazine's list of "The 100 Greatest Guitar Albums of All Time".
 In 2007, the album was ranked #32 on the Rock and Roll Hall of Fame's list of "The Definitive 200 Albums", which was developed by the National Association of Recording Merchandisers (NARM).
 In 2011, Australian radio station Triple M listed the album #1 on their list of "The 250 Most Life Changing Albums".
 In 2012, Slant Magazine listed the album at #37 on their list of "The Best Albums of the 1980s".
 In 2012, Clash added the album to its Classic Albums Hall of Fame.

Track listing

Original release

Remastered version

On April 30, 2018, billboards appeared in several large cities and a website was launched with the tagline "Destruction Is Coming". The website was updated with a countdown clock to May 4, 2018, and a snippet of the Hollywood Rose song "Shadow of Your Love" playing. Journalist Mitch Lafon stated the campaign was for a deluxe edition of Appetite for Destruction. A video announcement was inadvertently released a day early, detailing the Appetite for Destruction: Locked N Loaded edition, which was released June 29, 2018. The box set includes 73 songs  (49 of which were previously unreleased) on four compact discs and seven 12-inch 180-gram LPs. It features remastered versions of Live ?!*@ Like a Suicide, an EP of b-sides, 25 recordings from the group's 1986 Sound City Studios sessions with producer Manny Charlton, and two previously unreleased tracks from the group's sessions with Mike Clink. Three of the four songs from the G N' R Lies EP are included, with the exception of the controversial "One in a Million".

In addition to the music, this release included a 96-page book with unreleased photos from Rose's personal archive, 12 lithographs visualizing each song on the album, and assorted replica memorabilia. "Shadow of Your Love" was released as a single on May 4, 2018, making it the band's first single in almost a decade. The full Locked N' Loaded edition initially retailed for $999, but an edition that included the five discs and extras and standard editions with just the remastered album and bonus tracks were also made available. The Deluxe and Super Deluxe editions were also made available for streaming and paid download.

On May 21, 2018, the band released the unseen music video for "It's So Easy" on Apple Music. "Welcome to the Jungle" (1986 Sound City Session), "Move to the City" (1988 Acoustic Version), and "November Rain" (Piano Version, 1986 Sound City Session) were released as promotional singles in June, before the album's release. A hidden tape of the band's five-song 1985 Mystic Studios demo session is included as an easter egg in one of the drawers of the Locked N' Loaded edition.

A Pop-up shop was opened in London on the day of release, featuring Guns N' Roses themed drinks, a tattoo artist, merchandise, and a large screen showing the band's 1988 show at The Ritz.
The remastered release resulted in Appetite for Destruction re-entering the top 10 of the Billboard 200 for the first time in 29 years.

Reception

The box set received universal critical acclaim, with Metacritic scoring it 95 out of 100, based on nine reviews. It was nominated for a Grammy award for Best Boxed Set, the band's first nomination since 1993 (it lost to "Squeeze Box: The Complete Works of "Weird Al" Yankovic").

Deluxe edition

Super Deluxe edition
The "Locked N' Loaded" edition and the "Super Deluxe" edition have the same musical contents. Disc one is the original album.

A fifth disc is included: a Blu-ray disc with 96 kHz 24-bit 5.1 surround sound and stereo mixes (mixed by Elliot Scheiner and Frank Filipetti) of all of Appetite for Destruction, alongside bonus tracks "Shadow of Your Love", "Patience", "Used to Love Her", "You're Crazy", and "Move to the City" (1988 Acoustic version). In addition, this disc includes the music videos for "Welcome to the Jungle", "Sweet Child O' Mine", "Paradise City", and "Patience", and a previously-unreleased video for "It's So Easy".

Personnel
Credits are adapted from the album's liner notes.

Guns N' Roses
 W. Axl Rose – lead vocals, synthesizer on "Paradise City", percussion
 Slash – lead guitar, acoustic guitar, slide guitar, talk box, backing vocals
 Izzy Stradlin – rhythm guitar, lead guitar, backing vocals, percussion
 Duff "Rose" McKagan – bass guitar, backing vocals
 Steven Adler – drums

Production
 Mike Clink – production, engineering
 Steve Thompson – mixing
 Michael Barbiero – mixing
 George Marino – LP, cassette mastering
 Barry Diament – CD mastering
 Dave Reitzas – assistant engineer
 Micajah Ryan – assistant engineer
 Andy Udoff – assistant engineer
 Jeff Poe – assistant engineer
 Julian Stoll – assistant engineer
 Victor Deyglio – assistant engineer
 Adriana Smith – background vocals on "Rocket Queen" (uncredited)
 Ted Jensen – boxed set mastering at Sterling Sound, New York City

Design
 Robert Williams – "Appetite for Destruction" painting
 Michael Hodgson – art direction and design
 Robert John – photography
 Jack Lue – photography
 Greg Freeman – photography
 Marc Canter – photography
 Leonard McCardie – photography
 Bill White Jr. – cross tattoo design
 Andy Engell – cross tattoo redrawing

Charts

Weekly charts

Year-end charts

Certifications and sales

See also
 List of best-selling albums
 List of best-selling albums in the United States
 List of best-selling albums in Argentina
List of glam metal albums and songs

References

External links

 Appetite for Destruction at YouTube (streamed copy where licensed)
 Appetite for Destruction at Acclaimed Music (list of accolades)
 

1987 debut albums
Albums produced by Mike Clink
Albums recorded at Record Plant (Los Angeles)
Geffen Records albums
Guns N' Roses albums